Caloptilia viridula is a moth of the family Gracillariidae. It is known from Colombia.

References

viridula
Moths of South America
Moths described in 1877